WYCJ-LP (104.5 FM) is a low-power radio station broadcasting a religious format. Licensed to Simpsonville, South Carolina, United States, the station is currently owned by The Church in Simpsonville.

References

External links
 
 

YCJ-LP
Simpsonville, South Carolina
YCJ-LP